Glyn Jones (birth unknown – death unknown) was a Welsh rugby union and professional rugby league footballer who played in the 1930s, 1940s and 1950s.

International honours
Glyn Jones played  in Wales' 7–19 defeat by France at Stade Chaban-Delmas, Bordeaux on Sunday 24 March 1946.

References

Broughton Rangers players
Hull F.C. players
Place of birth missing
Rugby league hookers
Swansea RFC players
Wales national rugby league team players
Welsh rugby league players
Welsh rugby union players
Year of birth missing
Year of death missing